A Girl Named Mary is a 1919 American silent romantic drama film produced by Famous Players-Lasky and distributed by Paramount Pictures. Directed by Walter Edwards, the film is based on the novel of the same name by Juliet Wilbor Tompkins and stars Marguerite Clark. The film is now presumed to be lost.

Plot
As described in a film magazine, the widow Marisse Jaffrey (Williams) has searched the country over for her daughter Mary, who was taken from her when an infant. She becomes interested in Mary Healey (Clark), a stenographer, and investigates her home conditions. She meets Mrs. Healey (Herring), who believes Mary is her niece, although she has raised Mary to believe she is her daughter. When it is revealed that Mary is the missing daughter, complications arise from her unwillingness to leave the woman she believes is her mother. However, in the end satisfactory arrangements are made for the happiness of all.

Cast
Marguerite Clark as Mary Healey
Kathlyn Williams as Mrs. Jaffrey
Wallace MacDonald as Henry Martin
Aggie Herring as Mrs. Healey
Charles Clary as Hugh Le Baron
Lillian Leighton as Hannah
Pauline Pulliam as May Laguna
A. Edward Sutherland as Mr. Peavy
Helene Sullivan as Mona Molloy

References

External links

 
 
Period lobby poster to the film(Wayback Machine)
Film still (University of Washington, Sayre collection)
photo of lobby poster(archived)

1919 films
1919 romantic drama films
American romantic drama films
American silent feature films
American black-and-white films
Famous Players-Lasky films
Films based on American novels
Films based on romance novels
Lost American films
Paramount Pictures films
Films directed by Walter Edwards
1910s American films
Silent romantic drama films
Silent American drama films